Greek Bible may refer to:

 Bible translations into Greek
 The Septuagint, a Greek translation of the Hebrew Bible (the Old Testament)

 The New Testament
 Greek Vulgate, a polysemic expression
 Eastern / Greek Orthodox Bible, an English translation of the Bible
 Textus Receptus, an edition of the Greek New Testament published by Desiderius Erasmus
 Patriarchal text, published in 1904 by the Ecumenical Patriarchate

See also
 Greek Orthodox Church
 Bible translations into Greek
 Greek New Testament (disambiguation)